On a Day Like Today may refer to:

Music
 On a Day Like Today (album), an 1998 album by Bryan Adams, and the title song (see below)
 "On a Day Like Today" (song), 1998
 "On a Day Like Today", a song by Lesley Gore from Lesley Gore discography 1967
 "On a Day Like Today", a song by Keane from Hopes and Fears 2004

Other
 On a Day Like Today, the English name for the 2008 Egyptian film Zay El Naharda